Honeydale is a small community in Saint David Parish, Charlotte County, New Brunswick, Canada. 
The Road is at the northern terminus of Route 750 and Route 755.
It is located  NW of Upper Tower Hill.

History

It was first called Green Meadows, but a local storekeeper named George F. Beach started keeping honeybees, so the railroad men that worked on the tracks started calling it Honeydale. The name was made official in 1910.

Notable people

See also
List of communities in New Brunswick

References

Communities in Charlotte County, New Brunswick